Du borde tycka om mig is an album by Bo Kaspers Orkester, released in 2012.

Track listing
"Festen" – 5:14
"Världens ände" – 3:02
"Längre upp i bergen" – 3:52
"Innan du går" – 4:07
"Utan dig" – 4:27
"Snart kommer natten" – 2:57
"Vilket år" – 4:50
"Jag är vacker ikväll" – 2:59
"Mitt rätta jag" – 3:20
"Kom" – 2:49

Charts

Weekly charts

Year-end charts

References

Bo Kaspers Orkester albums
2012 albums